Yusup Mukhtanovich Guguyev (born 30 July 1972) is a Russian professional football coach and a former player.

Club career
He made his Russian Football National League debut for FC Angusht Nazran on 26 March 2006 in a game against FC Terek Grozny. That was his only season in the FNL.

Honours
 Russian Second Division Zone South top scorer: 1998 (29 goals), 2000 (30 goals).

External links
 

1972 births
Sportspeople from Grozny
Living people
Russian footballers
FC Zhemchuzhina Sochi players
FC Angusht Nazran players
Russian people of Chechen descent
Chechen people
Association football forwards